Komba is a given name. Notable people with the name include:

Komba Claudius Gbamanja, Sierra Leonean politician from the opposition Sierra Leone People's Party
Samuel Komba Kambo, retired captain in the Republic of Sierra Leone Armed Forces
Komba Eric Koedoyoma, Sierra Leonean politician with the Sierra Leone People's Party
Komba Mondeh (born in Freetown, Sierra Leone] was a top-ranking officer in the Sierra Leonean army
Komba Yomba (born 1976), Sierra Leonean international goalkeeper
Komba (mammal), an extinct genus of galagos
"Komba," the small galago featured in the British family film The Bushbaby (1969)
Komba (Lycia), a town of ancient Lycia
Komba Rural LLG in Morobe Province, Papua New Guinea

See also
Komba gewerkschaft, German trade union in Berlin

de:Komba
es:Komba